Arlene Duncan is a Canadian actress and singer from Oakville, Ontario. Her father is African Canadian, with ancestors from Nova Scotia. Duncan has appeared in more than 80 film and television roles, in addition to many theatrical productions. She is best known for her television role as Fatima, a diner owner in the CBC situation comedy Little Mosque on the Prairie.

Early life and education 
Arlene Duncan was born in Oakville, Ontario, to Alvin Aberdeen Duncan, a Royal Canadian Air Force veteran of World War II, and a Jamaican mother, Icilda. Her father's side of the family has been living in Canada for five generations. She is the great-grand-daughter of Benedict Duncan, a slave who fled Maryland through the Underground Railroad and became a sexton in Oakville. Her great-great-grandfather, Samuel Adams, moved to Canada in 1855. Duncan's family has been heavily involved in Oakville's Black community, her great-grandfather Jeremiah Adams was the groundkeeper of Turner Chapel (Oakville) and her father worked as Oakville’s resident Black historian until his death in 2009. Additionally, Duncan's mother founded the Canadian Caribbean Association of Halton. Canadian Olympic sprinter Donovan Bailey is Duncan's half-brother.

Duncan attended T. A. Blakelock High School in Oakville. During her time there, she was active drama and student band. She graduated from Sheridan College's musical theatre program. Duncan was a winner of the Du Maurier's Search for Stars contest and represented Canada at the Pacific Song Contest in 1979.

Career 
In 1982, Duncan released her debut single "I Wanna Grove", which won her the Female Vocalist of the Year Award at the 1983 Canadian Black Music Awards in 1983. Duncan also has performed under the name Kairene, releasing the single "I Need a Man" under Radikal Records in 1993. She has additionally sung jingles for McDonald's, Pepsi and Toyota. In 1994, the Black Label Artists Coalition awarded Duncan for Outstanding Achievement in Dance/House Music.

Duncan has been active in musical and dramatic theatre. She has been involved in theatrical productions of Sophisticated Ladies, Jacob Two-Two Meets the Hooded Fang, Once on This Island, The Mother Club, A Raisin in the Sun, Ain't Misbehavin', The Nutmeg Press, Recurring John and The Who's Tommy. Duncan won a Dora Mavor Moore Award in 2012 for Outstanding Performance by a Female (Musical) for her performance in Caroline, or Change. Duncan's performance as Caroline in Caroline, or Change earned her a Dora Mavor Moore Award in 2012 for Outstanding Performance by a Female (Musical) and a Toronto Theatre Critics Award for Best Actress in a Musical.

Duncan has appeared in many movies and televisions, most notably portraying café owner Fatima Dinssa on the CBC Television series Little Mosque on the Prairie. Duncan played Harriet Tubman in the CBC Television Special All for One, for which she received an ACTRA Award. Duncan later reprised the role of Harriet Tubman in 1995 in CBS's Gemini Awards-nominated "Sing Out, Freedom Train". In recent years, she has also appeared in minor roles on Degrassi: The Next Generation, Suits, and A Dog's Journey. Duncan's most notable recent role has been as Velma Diggs in the ongoing CBC Television series Diggstown.

Duncan has cited Diana Ross, Salome Bey, and Melba Moore as influences.

Work

Film

Television

Theatre

References

External links

20th-century Canadian actresses
20th-century Black Canadian women singers
21st-century Canadian actresses
21st-century Black Canadian women singers
Actresses from Ontario
Black Canadian actresses
Black Nova Scotians
Canadian film actresses
Canadian musical theatre actresses
Canadian people of African-American descent
Canadian stage actresses
Canadian television actresses
Dora Mavor Moore Award winners
Living people
People from Oakville, Ontario
Year of birth missing (living people)